The Teufelsloch ("Devil's Hole") is a karst spring near Osterode am Harz in the German state of Lower Saxony.

Description 
The Teufelsloch is located southeast of Augustental in mature forest near the Karst Trail. It is a circular sinkhole with lustrous blue-green water. The stream that drains it feeds the Teufelsbäder moor to the west, and then flows through the Apenke to the river Söse. After heavy rain, other springs rise in the area around its banks that give the karst water in the Teufelsloch a brownish colour. The Teufelsloch lies within the Nature Reserve.

Folk stories 
In earlier times, the Teufelsloch was perceived as something rather threatening. The origin of its shimmering blue waters rising from eerie depths could not be explained by the people. They talked of will-o'-the-wisps of human size, who would lure wanderers at night over a bent tree into the Teufelsloch. Others believed that the devil in the form of a giant one-eyed fish with a needle-sharp bite, lurked in the water.

External links 

Legend about the Teufelsloch at karstwanderweg.de 
Naturschutzgebiet Teufelsbäder on the pages of the Lower Saxon State Department for Waterway, Coastal and Nature Conservation (NLWKN)

Springs of Germany
Karst springs
Karst formations of Germany
Landforms of Lower Saxony
Osterode am Harz
STeufelsloch